Rodrigo Nicolo Román Valdez (born 20 June 1986) is a Paraguayan football defender who currently plays for Cerro Porteño.

References

External links
 BDFA profile

Living people
Paraguayan footballers
Association football defenders
Cerro Porteño players
1986 births